Vanessa Paradis is the third studio album and English-language debut by French singer Vanessa Paradis, released on 21 September 1992 by Remark Records. It contains the singles "Be My Baby" and "Sunday Mondays".

Background and writing
Lenny Kravitz, who was dating Paradis at the time, produced and co-wrote the album. Some editions of the album contain the extra track "Gotta Have It", which is a tribute to Kravitz and is co-written by Kravitz himself. This was omitted on the US release of the album.

The album is noted for being the first time Paradis took creative control over her music. It is also noted for being innovative in its use of instruments, and for its replication of the 1960s soundscape on virtually every song. A one-hour television special on the making of the album was recorded in 1992 and aired on 28 March 1993 on French channel Canal+.

Critical reception

The album was one of her most successful and most critically acclaimed, proving to be both popular in France and the UK. It spawned several successful singles, including one of her most recognisable songs "Be My Baby".

Track listing

Personnel

Tony Breit – bass guitar (tracks 1, 2, 9, 11)
Debbe Cole – backing vocals (track 4)
David Domanich – engineer
Greg Di Gesu – assistant engineer
Jamal Haines – trombone (track 6)
Henry Hirsch – bass guitar, engineer, harpsichord, mixing, organ, piano, string arrangement, Wurlitzer
Judith Hobson-Mitchell – backing vocals (track 10)
Huart/Cholley – design
Michael Hunter – trumpet (track 9)
Lenny Kravitz – backing vocals, bass guitar, drums, Fender Rhodes, guitar, harmonica, horn arrangement, Mellotron, sitar, string arrangement, tambourine, vocal arrangement
Richard Mitchell – backing vocals (track 10)
Jean-Baptiste Mondino – photography

B.J. Nelson – backing vocals (track 4)
Didier Pain – executive producer
Vanessa Paradis – backing vocals, tambourine (track 6)
Antoine Roney – saxophone (track 9)
Craig Ross – guitar
Angie Stone – backing vocals (tracks 2, 10)

String quintet (tracks 1, 4, 5, 7)
Eric Delente – violin
Soye Kim – violin
Sarah Adams – viola
Allen Whear – cello
John Whitfield – cello

Charts

Certifications and sales

References

1992 albums
Albums produced by Lenny Kravitz
Vanessa Paradis albums